Villa Borghese or Villa Borghese Pinciana ('Borghese familyBorghese villa on the Pincian Hill') is the villa built by the architect Flaminio Ponzio (and, after his death, finished by his assistant Giovanni Vasanzio), developing sketches by Scipione Borghese. Scipione Borghese used it as a villa suburbana, a party villa, at the edge of Rome, and to house his art collection. 
The Galleria Borghese now occupies the villa, and the Villa Borghese gardens surround the villa.

Other villas held by the Borghese family may also be known as Villa Borghese.

See also
Temple of Aesculapius (Villa Borghese)
Palazzo Borghese

External links 
 A 3D reconstruction of the decorated facades on the Louvre's web site

 
Borghese residences